Pokuru  is a rural community in the Waipa District and Waikato region of New Zealand's North Island.

It is located southwest of Te Awamutu, southeast of Pirongia and north of Ōtorohanga, between State Highway 39 and State Highway 1.

It has two marae:
 Kakepuku Marae and Papakainga meeting house is a meeting place of the Ngāti Maniapoto hapū of Kahu, Mākino, Ngāti Matakore, Ngutu and Waiora.
 Te Kōpua Marae and Ko Unu meeting house is a meeting place of the Ngāti Maniapoto hapū of Kahu and Unu, and the Waikato Tainui hapū of Apakura and Ngāti Mahuta.

Demographics
The SA1 area is part of the larger Pokuru statistical area.

The SA1 area had a population of 207 at the 2018 New Zealand census, an increase of 9 people (4.5%) since the 2013 census, and an increase of 36 people (21.1%) since the 2006 census. There were 72 households, comprising 105 males and 102 females, giving a sex ratio of 1.03 males per female. The median age was 34.3 years (compared with 37.4 years nationally), with 51 people (24.6%) aged under 15 years, 36 (17.4%) aged 15 to 29, 102 (49.3%) aged 30 to 64, and 18 (8.7%) aged 65 or older.

Ethnicities were 76.8% European/Pākehā, 11.6% Māori, 1.4% Pacific peoples, 1.4% Asian, and 15.9% other ethnicities. People may identify with more than one ethnicity.

Although some people chose not to answer the census's question about religious affiliation, 50.7% had no religion, 30.4% were Christian, 1.4% had Māori religious beliefs and 2.9% had other religions.

Of those at least 15 years old, 27 (17.3%) people had a bachelor's or higher degree, and 27 (17.3%) people had no formal qualifications. The median income was $42,900, compared with $31,800 nationally. 33 people (21.2%) earned over $70,000 compared to 17.2% nationally. The employment status of those at least 15 was that 87 (55.8%) people were employed full-time, 18 (11.5%) were part-time, and 3 (1.9%) were unemployed.

Pokuru statistical area

The statistical area had a population of 1,425 at the 2018 New Zealand census, an increase of 162 people (12.8%) since the 2013 census, and an increase of 258 people (22.1%) since the 2006 census. There were 489 households, comprising 714 males and 708 females, giving a sex ratio of 1.01 males per female. The median age was 37.7 years (compared with 37.4 years nationally), with 336 people (23.6%) aged under 15 years, 240 (16.8%) aged 15 to 29, 648 (45.5%) aged 30 to 64, and 195 (13.7%) aged 65 or older.

Ethnicities were 89.7% European/Pākehā, 12.8% Māori, 0.8% Pacific peoples, 1.9% Asian, and 4.0% other ethnicities. People may identify with more than one ethnicity.

The percentage of people born overseas was 11.8, compared with 27.1% nationally.

Although some people chose not to answer the census's question about religious affiliation, 50.9% had no religion, 37.1% were Christian, 0.6% had Māori religious beliefs, 0.2% were Hindu, 0.2% were Buddhist and 1.5% had other religions.

Of those at least 15 years old, 183 (16.8%) people had a bachelor's or higher degree, and 204 (18.7%) people had no formal qualifications. The median income was $41,200, compared with $31,800 nationally. 237 people (21.8%) earned over $70,000 compared to 17.2% nationally. The employment status of those at least 15 was that 612 (56.2%) people were employed full-time, 183 (16.8%) were part-time, and 30 (2.8%) were unemployed.

Education

The school opened as Kakepuku School in 1907, and became Pokuru School in 1926.

References

Waipa District
Populated places in Waikato